Taq Taq may refer to:
 Taq Taq, Fars (طاق طاق - Ţāq Ţāq)
 Taq Taq, Kermanshah (تق تق -Taq Taq)